The 1998 WNBA Playoffs was the postseason for the Women's National Basketball Association's 1998 season which ended with the   Houston Comets beating the Phoenix Mercury, 2-1. Cynthia Cooper was named the MVP of the Finals. The Comets repeated as champions.

Road to the playoffs
Eastern Conference

Western Conference

Note:Teams with an "X" clinched playoff spots.

Playoffs

Semifinals

Houston Comets vs. Charlotte Sting

Cleveland Rockers vs. Phoenix Mercury

WNBA Championship

See also
WNBA Finals

References

Playoffs
Women's National Basketball Association Playoffs